In organic chemistry, a Schiff base (named after Hugo Schiff) is a compound with the general structure  ( = alkyl or aryl, but not hydrogen). They can be considered a sub-class of imines, being either secondary ketimines or secondary aldimines depending on their structure.  The term is often synonymous with azomethine which refers specifically to secondary aldimines (i.e.  where R' ≠ H).

A number of special naming systems exist for these compounds. For instance a Schiff base derived from an aniline, where  is a phenyl or a substituted phenyl, can be called an anil, while bis-compounds are often referred to as salen-type compounds.

The term Schiff base is normally applied to these compounds when they are being used as ligands to form coordination complexes with metal ions. Such complexes occur naturally, for instance in corrin, but the majority of Schiff bases are artificial and are used to form many important catalysts, such as Jacobsen's catalyst.

Synthesis 
Schiff bases can be synthesized from an aliphatic or aromatic amine and a carbonyl compound by nucleophilic addition forming a hemiaminal, followed by a dehydration to generate an imine. In a typical reaction, 4,4'-oxydianiline reacts with o-vanillin:

Biochemistry 
Schiff bases have been investigated in relation to a wide range of contexts, including antimicrobial, antiviral and anticancer activity. They have also been considered for the inhibition of amyloid-β aggregation.

Schiff bases are common enzymatic intermediates where an amine, such as the terminal group of a lysine residue, reversibly reacts with an aldehyde or ketone of a cofactor or substrate. The common enzyme cofactor pyridoxal phosphate (PLP) forms a Schiff base with a lysine residue and is transaldiminated to the substrate(s). Similarly, the cofactor retinal forms a Schiff base in rhodopsins, including human rhodopsin (via Lysine 296), which is key in the photoreception mechanism.

Coordination chemistry
Schiff bases are common ligands in coordination chemistry. The imine nitrogen is basic and exhibits pi-acceptor properties. The ligands are typically derived from alkyl diamines and aromatic aldehydes.

Chiral Schiff bases were one of the first ligands used for asymmetric catalysis. In 1968 Ryōji Noyori developed a copper-Schiff base complex for the metal-carbenoid cyclopropanation of styrene. For this work he was later awarded a share of the 2001 Nobel Prize in Chemistry. Schiff bases have also been incorporated into metal–organic frameworks (MOF).

Conjugated Schiff bases
Conjugated Schiff bases absorb strongly in the UV-visible region of the electromagnetic spectrum.  This absorption is the basis of the anisidine value, which is a measure of oxidative spoilage for fats and oils.

References

Further reading

 organic field-effect transistor (OFET) 

Functional groups
Imines
Organometallic chemistry
Ligands